Always Ready may refer to:

 Club Always Ready, a Bolivian football club
 Always Ready (TV series), a Hong Kong drama series
 Semper paratus, a Latin phrase meaning "always ready" that is the motto of several organizations.

See also
NWA Alwayz Ready, a wrestling pay-per-view event